Zaprudny is a rural locality (a settlement) in Panfilovskoye Rural Settlement, Novoanninsky District, Volgograd Oblast, Russia. The population was 7 as of 2010. There are 2 streets.

Geography 
Zaprudny is located in steppe on the Khopyorsko-Buzulukskaya Plain, 37 km southeast of Novoanninsky (the district's administrative centre) by road. Trud-Rassvet is the nearest rural locality.

References 

Rural localities in Novoanninsky District